Psylla carpinicola is a species of plant-parasitic hemipteran in the family Psyllidae.

References

Further reading

External links

 

Psyllidae
Insects described in 1914